Michael Marks was one of the two co-founders of the retail chain Marks & Spencer.

Michael Marks may also refer to:

Michael E. Marks (born 1960), American author, poet and songwriter
Michael Marks (footballer) (born 1968), English former footballer
Michael Marks (financier) (born 1941), British businessman
Michael Marks (Saw franchise), fictional character

See also
Michael Mark (disambiguation)